Scott Carroll Williams (born January 16, 1971, in Thousand Oaks, California) is a former field hockey defender.  Williams competed for the United States since 1993 and finished twelfth with the national team at the 1996 Summer Olympics in Atlanta, Georgia.  He won four medals in six Olympic Festival appearances, and he played for Ventura Roadrunners/Thousand Oaks (California) Bulldogs.

References 
 USA Field Hockey

External links
 

1971 births
Living people
American male field hockey players
Olympic field hockey players of the United States
Field hockey players at the 1996 Summer Olympics
People from Thousand Oaks, California
Sportspeople from Ventura County, California